Old Union County Courthouse is a historic courthouse located at Vine and Market Streets in New Berlin, Union County, Pennsylvania. It was built in 1815, and renovated in 1855–1857, to convert it to a schoolhouse. It is a -story, brick building, three bays wide and four bays deep with a gable roof. The roof features a center cupola. It was used as a school until 1952.

It now houses the New Berlin Heritage Museum, also known as the New Berlin Post Office and the Courthouse Museum. The museum is open by appointment and on New Berlin Day, a street festival held each year at the end of August.

It was listed on the National Register of Historic Places in 1972.

See also
 List of state and county courthouses in Pennsylvania

References

External links
 New Berlin Heritage Museum - Town of New Berlin

Courthouses on the National Register of Historic Places in Pennsylvania
County courthouses in Pennsylvania
Government buildings completed in 1857
Buildings and structures in Union County, Pennsylvania
Museums in Union County, Pennsylvania
National Register of Historic Places in Union County, Pennsylvania
1857 establishments in Pennsylvania